Gabriel Gracida (born 1 May 1900, date of death unknown) was a Mexican equestrian. He competed at the 1928 Summer Olympics and the 1948 Summer Olympics.

References

1900 births
Year of death missing
Mexican male equestrians
Mexican dressage riders
Olympic equestrians of Mexico
Equestrians at the 1932 Summer Olympics
Equestrians at the 1948 Summer Olympics
Place of birth missing
Medalists at the 1951 Pan American Games
Pan American Games silver medalists for Mexico